Tanja Vreden (born 10 February 1977) is a German former footballer who played as a forward. She made six appearances for the Germany national team from 1998 to 1999.

References

External links
 

1977 births
Living people
German women's footballers
Women's association football forwards
Germany women's international footballers
Footballers from Hamburg